Enfraz or Infraz, also called Guba'e, or Guzara  is a historic town and district in northern Ethiopia.

Enfranz is located on the all-weather asphalt road which connects Bahir Dar to Gondar. With improvements to this road and the advent of electrical service, since 2005 Enfranz has become an important market center for fish from Lake Tana.

History 
The earliest notice of Enfraz was in the 14th century, when Gebre Iyasu, a disciple of Ewostatewos, founded a monastery there. The Imam Ahmad Gragn camped there during the rainy season of 1543, after he defeated Cristovão da Gama at the Battle of Wofla. The Emperor Menas later used it as his camp during the rainy season of 1559, and thereafter it was favored as an administrative center by the succeeding Emperors: Sarsa Dengel spent the rainy season there three times between 1571 and 1580, then every rainy season for four years beginning with 1585, eventually building a stone castle there, possibly modelled on the Ottoman fort at Debarwa.

Despite the move of the capital to Gondar, Enfraz still retained some importance in the following years. When the European traveler Charles Jacques Poncet visited the town around 1700, he compared it favorably to Gondar. He describes how it was an important marketplace for slaves and civet, favored by Ethiopian Muslims because there they could openly practice their religion, unlike in Gondar. The Emperor Tewoflos held his coronation in Enfraz a few years later.

While over the next fifty years Enfraz declined in importance when James Bruce visited the town he remarked on its trade in blue Surat cloth.

Records at the Nordic Africa Institute website records that by 1967 the Ethiopian Telecommunications Company had a pay telephone station in this town, but no telephone subscribers.

Demographics 
Based on figures from the Central Statistical Agency in 2005, Enfraz has an estimated total population of 9,162, of whom 4,375 were males and 4,787 were females. The 1994 census reported this town had a total population of 5,302 of whom 2,302 were males and 3,000 were females. It is one of four towns in Gondar Zuria woreda.

Notes

External links
16th century Guzara castle and 17th-century Dabsan or "Patriarch's house" in Enfraz district.

Populated places in the Amhara Region
Populated places on Lake Tana
North Gondar Zone